The Middleway Historic District comprises sixty major buildings from the late 18th century and early 19th century in Middleway, West Virginia.  Middleway was a crossroads town on the Shepherdstown-Berryville road and the Charles Town turnpike.  The town was established by John Smith, Sr. and Jr., along with son and brother Rees Smith, who had established grist and hemp mills by 1734 along Turkey Run.  The town was not, however, officially established until 1798.  The town never followed up on its original growth, allowing the older stone, brick and log houses to be preserved.

References

Gothic Revival architecture in West Virginia
Federal architecture in West Virginia
National Register of Historic Places in Jefferson County, West Virginia
Historic districts in Jefferson County, West Virginia
Commercial buildings on the National Register of Historic Places in West Virginia
Houses on the National Register of Historic Places in West Virginia
Houses in Jefferson County, West Virginia
Historic districts on the National Register of Historic Places in West Virginia
Log buildings and structures on the National Register of Historic Places in West Virginia